NoGravity is a space flight simulation and space shooter developed by realtech VR, a Montreal based, French Canadian independent computer games company. The game was ported to many platforms over the years as it was open sourced in 2005.  drew comparisons with the Wing Commander series.

Gameplay
 is a 3D space shooter which allows players to control a spaceship from the first-person or third-person perspective. The object is to accomplish missions, with diverse objectives ranging from destroying enemy ships or bases, escorting allied ships, raiding ground bases, clearing minefields, etc.

History 

Open source
On February 16, 2005 realtech VR open sourced  with the creation of a SourceForge repository. The source code and assets of the classic  are released under the terms of the GNU GPL-2.0-or-later, making the game freeware and free and open source software. The game was made available for Windows XP, AmigaOS, Linux, macOS, and BeOS. 

The game was ported by the community to the PSP. 
In 2014 a port of the classic version on the OpenPandora handheld followed.

Extended mobile versions
In 2009 an extended official PSP port, named No Gravity: The Plague of Mind to differentiate from the "classic" older version, was released. In 2011 an iOS port followed, in 2013 releases for Windows mobile and OUYA.

Reception 
The game was offered by multiple websites as freeware download and reviewed several times over the years.

The classic No Gravity was downloaded alone via SourceForge between 2005 and May 2017 over 270,000 times.

Metacritic rated the PSP version with 65% from eight reviews.

References

External links 

 realtech VR official web site
 No Gravity official web site
 nogravity official source code repository on sourceforge.net
 

Science fiction video games
Space combat simulators
Commercial video games with freely available source code
Open-source video games
Freeware games
Indie video games
Single-player video games